Cossato is a municipality in the province of Biella, Italy, in the northwest part of Piedmont,  east of Biella. It has a population of about 14,804 and it spreads over an area of 27,74 km², which makes it the second largest town in the Province of Biella. It is crossed by the Strona di Mosso stream.

Geography
The city is the second largest town in the province of Biella by population and economic importance. It has an urban development that follows the direction of the major roads: the center is along the Biella-Gattinara former state road, while numerous frazioni are scattered along the road to Mottalciata baraggivo plateau and the hills towards Quaregna, Lessona and Valle Mosso.

Main sights

 Parish dedicated to the Assumption, built before 1000. It was rebuilt in 1614 after the collapse, which occurred two years before. 
 Castle Castellengo, on the edge of the Baragge of Candelo. 
 Church of SS. Peter and Paul, near the Castellengo Castle. medieval building restored over the years with the addition of different styles. 
 Villa Ranzoni, eighteenth-century building houses the Municipal Library. 
 Villa Fecia, building belonging to Fecia accounts of Cossato including a large park and a church, the Oratory of Santa Margherita (in medieval style). 
 Villa Berlanghino, in the neoclassical style. It is a large building with a wooden staircase and a public park outside. 
 Natural reserve of Baragge

Government

List of mayors

Twin towns
 Neve Shalom, Israel

References

 
Cities and towns in Piedmont